On 30 October 2000, the separatist Basque organization ETA detonated a large car bomb on Badajoz Avenue in Madrid, Spain. The blast killed three people; a Spanish Supreme Court judge, Francisco Querol Lombardero, his driver, and his bodyguard. One of the injured, a bus driver, died from his injuries days later. Sixty-four people were wounded. It was the deadliest attack since the ETA called off its ceasefire in December 1999 and one of numerous attacks in Madrid.

See also 
1992 Madrid bombing
1993 Madrid bombings
2004 Madrid train bombings
List of ETA attacks

References

ETA (separatist group) actions
Terrorist incidents in Spain
2000 crimes in Spain
Terrorist incidents in Spain in 2000
2000 in Spain